The Agency is an American reality series that aired on VH1 in 2007.

Overview
The series followed modeling agents that worked for the men and women's high-end division of the Wilhelmina Modeling Agency.

Participants
 Sean Patterson – President
 Greg – Men's Board Agent
 Anita – Men's Board Agent
 Lorri – Men's Board Agent
 Pink – Head of High-End Women's Board
 Becky – High-End Women's Board Agent
 Carlos – High-End Women's Board Agent
 Lola – High-End Women's Board Assistant
 Paul Wharton – Model Coach

Episodes

External links
 

VH1 original programming
Modeling-themed reality television series
2007 American television series debuts
2007 American television series endings
2000s American reality television series
English-language television shows
Television shows set in New York City